Lee Jang-Kwan (born July 4, 1974) is a South Korean football manager and retired player. He currently manages Jeonnam Dragons of K League 2.

Club career statistics

References

External links
 

1974 births
Living people
Association football midfielders
South Korean footballers
Busan IPark players
Incheon United FC players
K League 1 players
Footballers from Seoul